Colombian group ChocQuibTown has released four studio albums, two  extended plays, one remix album and thirteen singles (including three as featured artist), and three promotional singles.

Albums

Studio albums

Remix albums

Extended plays

Singles

As lead artist

As featured artist

Guest appearances

Notes

References

ChocQuibTown